The Sichuanese, Sze Chuan or Ssu Ch'uan people (Sichuanese Pinyin: Si4cuan1ren2; Mandarin Chinese ,  or ) are a Han Chinese subgroup comprising most of the population of China's Sichuan province and Chongqing municipality.

History

Beginning from the 9th century BC, Shu (on the Chengdu Plain) and Ba (which had its first capital at Enshi City in Hubei and controlled part of the Han Valley) emerged as cultural and administrative centers where two rival kingdoms were established. Although eventually the Qin dynasty destroyed the kingdoms of Shu and Ba, the Qin government accelerated the technological and agricultural advancements of Sichuan making it comparable to that of the Yellow River Valley. The now-extinct Ba-Shu language was derived from Qin-era settlers and represents the earliest documented division from Middle Chinese.

South Sichuan was also inhabited by the Dai people who formed the serfs class. They were later thoroughly sinicized, adopting the local language of speech. Large numbers of foreigner merchant families from Sogdia, Iran and other countries immigrated to Sichuan.

During the Yuan and Ming dynasties, the population of Sichuan, Chongqing had been reduced due to immigration, deportation and flight of refugees fleeing war and plague, new or returning settlers from modern Hunan, Hubei, Guangdong and Jiangxi, replacing the earlier spoken language with different languages they adopted from the former regions to form a new standard language off communication.

Recent history
Many migrant workers from rural Sichuan have migrated to other parts of the country, where they often face discrimination in employment, housing etc. This is due to China's household registration policy and other parts of people from midwest China face the same problem.

Language

The Sichuanese once spoke their own variety of spoken Chinese called Ba-Shu Chinese, or Old Sichuanese before it became extinct during the Ming dynasty. Now most of them speak Sichuanese Mandarin. The Minjiang dialects are thought by some linguists to be a bona fide descendant of Old Sichuanese due to many characteristics of Ba-Shu Chinese phonology and vocabulary being found in the dialects, but there is no conclusive evidence whether Minjiang dialects are derived from Old Sichuanese or Southwestern Mandarin.

Cuisine

Sichuan is well known for its spicy cuisine and use of Sichuan peppers due to its more arid climate.

Notable people
Well known Sichuanese people are such as:
 Ba Jin (1904–2005), author and political activist
 Bai Ling (1966–), actress
 Chang Dai-chien (1899–1983), artist
 Chang Chün (1889–1990), premier of the Republic of China
 Fala Chen (1982–), actress
 Chen Pokong (1963–), author, political commentator and democracy activist
 Chen Shou (233–297), official and writer
 Cheung Chung-kiu (1964–), business magnate
 Deng Xiaoping (1904–1997), revolutionary and politician
 GAI (1988–), rapper, singer, and songwriter
 Guo Moruo (1892–1978), author, poet, historian, archaeologist, and government official 
 Huang Jiguang (1931–1952), highly decorated soldier during the Korean War
 Jiang Zhuyun (1920–1949), revolutionary martyr
 Li Bai (701–762), poet
 Li Bifeng (1965–), activist, poet and Christian
 Li Shou-min, a.k.a. Huanzhulouzhu (1902–1961), novelist of the xianxia genre
 Liu Yonghao (1952–), businessman
 Li Yifeng (1987–), actor and singer
 Li Yuchun (1984–), singer, songwriter, and actress
 Luo Ruiqing (1906–1978), army officer and politician
 Sanyu (painter) (1901–1966)
 Chʽeng-Tsi Song (1892–1955), Anglican bishop
 Song Yonghua (1964–), scholar
 Su Shi (1037–1101), writer, poet, painter, calligrapher, pharmacologist, gastronome, and statesman
 Su Xun (1009–1066), writer
 Su Zhe (1039–1112), politician and essayist
 Tan Weiwei (1982–), singer and actress
 Tang Chun-i (1909–1978), philosopher and scholar
 Wang Chiu-chiang (1957–), painter
 Wang Jianlin (1954–), business magnate, investor, and philanthropist
 Wang Xiaoya (1968–), television host and media personality
 Wang Yi (pastor) (1973–)
 Xu Youyu (1947–), scholar
 Yang Xiong (53 BC – 18 AD), poet, philosopher, and politician
 Y. C. James Yen (1890/1893–1990), educator
 Lucy Yi Zhenmei (1815–1862), Roman Catholic saint
 Yu Jie (1973–), Calvinist democracy activist
 Zhang Lan (1872–1955), political activist
 Zhang Yong (restaurateur) (1969/1970–), Singapore's richest man in 2019
 Zhao Yiman (1905–1936), resistance fighter
 Zheng Ji (1900–2010), nutritionist and pioneering biochemist
 Zhu De (1886–1976), general, warlord, politician, and revolutionary
 Zhuo Wenjun, poet
 Zou Rong (1885–1905), revolutionary martyr

See also 
 Erlang Shen
 Jinsha site
 Sanxingdui
 Sichuan opera
 Catholic Church in Sichuan
 Protestantism in Sichuan

References

Dai people
Subgroups of the Han Chinese
Nakhi people
Tujia people
Qiang people
Yi people
Ethnic groups in Sichuan